Campora is a town and comune in the province of Salerno, Campania (southern Italy). It is located in the territory of Cilento and as of 2009 its population was 810.

History

Geography
The village is located in a hilly area in the middle of Cilento, close to Stio and to the area of Pruno, not far from the town of Vallo della Lucania. It borders with the municipalities of Cannalonga, Gioi, Laurino, Moio della Civitella, Novi Velia and Stio.

See also
Pruno Cilento
Cilentan language
Cilento and Vallo di Diano National Park

References

External links

 Comune of Campora 

Localities of Cilento